The 1927 Missouri Valley Intercollegiate Athletic Association football season consisted of a record 10 member institutions. The regular season champions were Missouri. Missouri had a conference win percentage of .833%.

Standings

External links
Big Eight Conference Annual Standings